Ghost at the Finish Line is a solo studio album by American rapper Quelle Chris. It was released via Mello Music Group on October 29, 2013. The thirteen-track record featured guest appearances by the likes of Alchemist, Black Milk, Denmark Vessey, Fuzz Scoota, Guilty Simpson, House Shoes, Jimetta Rose, Marv Won, and Mosel.

Critical reception

Jesse Fairfax of HipHopDX gave the album a 4.0 out of 5, writing, "The album best functions as a sobering look at an underdog determined to win on his own terms, its minimalist aspects reflecting the human struggle to elevate on both personal and professional levels."

Track listing

References

External links
 

2013 albums
Hip hop albums by American artists
Mello Music Group albums
Albums produced by Quelle Chris
Albums produced by Oh No (musician)
Albums produced by Knxwledge